This is a list of Chinese football transfers for the 2019 season summer transfer window. Super League and League One transfer window opened on 1 July 2019 and closed on 31 July 2019. League Two transfer window opened on 17 June 2019 and closed on 12 July 2019.

Super League

Beijing Renhe

In:

Out:

Beijing Sinobo Guoan

In:

Out:

Chongqing Dangdai Lifan

In:

Out:

Dalian Yifang

In:

Out:

Guangzhou Evergrande Taobao

In:

Out:

Guangzhou R&F

In:

Out:

Hebei China Fortune

In:

Out:

Henan Jianye

In:

Out:

Jiangsu Suning

In:

Out:

Shandong Luneng Taishan

In:

Out:

Shanghai Greenland Shenhua

In:

Out:

Shanghai SIPG

In:

Out:

Shenzhen F.C.

In:

Out:

Tianjin TEDA

In:

Out:

Tianjin Tianhai

In:

Out:

Wuhan Zall

In:

Out:

League One

Beijing BSU

In:

Out:

Changchun Yatai

In:

Out:

Guangdong South China Tiger

In:

Out:

Guizhou Hengfeng

In:

Out:

Heilongjiang Lava Spring

In:

Out:

Inner Mongolia Zhongyou

In:

Out:

Liaoning F.C.

In:

Out:

Meizhou Hakka

In:

Out:

Nantong Zhiyun

In:

Out:

Qingdao Huanghai

In:

Out:

Shaanxi Chang'an Athletic

In:

Out:

Shanghai Shenxin

In:

Out:

Shijiazhuang Ever Bright

In:

Out:

Sichuan Longfor

In:

Out:

Xinjiang Tianshan Leopard

In:

Out:

Zhejiang Greentown

In:

Out:

League Two

North League

Baoding Yingli ETS

In:

Out:

Beijing BIT

In:

Out:

Dalian Chanjoy

In:

Out:

Hebei Aoli Jingying

In:

Out:

Inner Mongolia Caoshangfei

In:

Out:

Jiangsu Yancheng Dingli

In:

Out:

Jilin Baijia

In:

Out:

Qingdao Jonoon

In:

Out:

Qingdao Red Lions

In:

Out:

Shanxi Metropolis

In:

Out:

Shenyang Urban

In:

Out:

Taizhou Yuanda

In:

Out:

Xi'an Daxing Chongde

In:

Out:

Yanbian Beiguo

In:

Out:

Yinchuan Helanshan

In:

Out:

Zibo Cuju

In:

Out:

South League

Chengdu Better City

In:

Out:

Fujian Tianxin

In:

Out:

Guangxi Baoyun

In:

Out:

Hangzhou Wuyue Qiantang

In:

Out:

Hubei Chufeng United

In:

Out:

Hunan Billows

In:

Out:

Jiangxi Liansheng

In:

Out:

Kunshan F.C.

In:

Out:

Lhasa Urban Construction Investment

In:

Out:

Nanjing Shaye

In:

Out:

Shenzhen Pengcheng

In:

Out:

Sichuan Jiuniu

In:

Out:

Suzhou Dongwu

In:

Out:

Wuhan Three Towns

In:

Out:

Yunnan Kunlu

In:

Out:

Zhejiang Yiteng

In:

Out:

Note

References

2019
China